Tapiola Church is a Lutheran church in the Tapiola district of Espoo, Finland. The modernist concrete building was designed by architect Aarno Ruusuvuori and opened in 1965. The church seats 600 people and is thus the largest in Espoo by capacity.

The church is part of the garden city of Tapiola which is internationally famous for its architecture and listed as a nationally significant built cultural heritage site by the National Board of Antiquities. Docomomo has also selected Tapiola as a significant example of modern architecture in Finland.

See also
 Hyvinkää Church, another church by Aarno Ruusuvuori

References

External links
 
 Tapiolan kirkko 

Lutheran churches in Finland
Churches completed in 1965
Modernist architecture in Finland
Buildings and structures in Espoo
Aarno Ruusuvuori buildings
Tapiola